Leninsky City District is one of the seven city districts of the city of Perm in Perm Krai, Russia. Population:  It is the least populous city district of Perm.

Name

The city district is named after Vladimir Lenin, a Russian revolutionary and politician and the founder of the Soviet state.

On October 4, 1954, in the center of Komsomolsky garden in front of Perm Academic Opera and Ballet Theater, the monument to Lenin was installed. The author of this monument was Soviet sculptor Georgy Neroda, a corresponding member of USSR Academy of Arts.

Geography
The city district is situated on both banks of the Kama River. The part on the right bank is sparsely populated and mostly covered by forest. The city center is situated on the left bank of Kama.

Largest streets

Lenina Street
Komsomolsky Avenue

Establishments

Educational establishments:
Perm State Technical University;
Perm State Institute of Arts and Culture.
Theatres:
Perm Academic Opera and Ballet Theater;
Perm Academic Drama Theater.

References

City districts of Perm, Russia